Sir Alfred Hamilton Grant, 12th Baronet  (12 June 1872 – 23 January 1937), known as Hamilton Grant, and from 1918 as Sir Hamilton Grant, was a British diplomat who served primarily in India. He was also briefly a Liberal Party politician.

Background
Grant was born in Edinburgh, Scotland on 12 June 1872, the son of Sir Alexander Grant, 10th Baronet. He was educated at Fettes College, Edinburgh and Balliol College, Oxford. While at Oxford he won a Rugby football blue. In 1896 he married Mabel Bessie Lovett. They had one daughter Audrey and one son Alexander. In 1910 Mabel died. In 1914 he married Margaret Lucia Cochran of Ashkirk, Selkirkshire. They had one son and two daughters. Following the death of his brother he succeeded to the title of 12th Baronet Grant of Dalvey on 11 February 1936.

Diplomatic service
In 1895 Grant entered the Indian Civil Service. He was Deputy Commissioner of various Frontier districts and Secretary to Frontier Administration. In 1904 he accompanied the Dane Mission to Kabul. In 1908 he was awarded a Companion of the Indian Empire. In 1914 he was appointed Foreign Secretary to the Government of India, serving for 5 years. In 1915 he was awarded a Companion of the Star of India. In 1918 he was awarded a Knight Commander of the Indian Empire. In 1919, after the Third Anglo-Afghan War, he was the Chief Delegate at the Rawalpindi Conference which ended the British protectorate of Afghanistan. He served as the Chief Commissioner of the North-West Frontier Province of British India from 1919 until 1921. In 1922 he was awarded a Knight Commander of the Star of India.

Political activity
In 1922 Grant left India and returned to Britain. He decided to pursue a political career and was chosen as Liberal candidate for Roxburgh and Selkirk where his wife was from. At the time, the Liberals were split between supporters of H. H. Asquith and supporters of Prime Minister David Lloyd George. Grant was a supporter of Asquith and the Roxburgh seat was held by a supporter of Lloyd George. At the general election held that year, the other parties left the seat for the two Liberal candidates and Grant was narrowly defeated;

He did not stand for parliament again.

Business activity
Grant was a Director of Anglo-Huronian, Ltd, Associated Mining and Finance Co., Ltd, Northern Rhodesia Co., Ltd, General Co-operative Investment Trust, Ltd and HE Proprietary Ltd.

External links
Grant at the National Portrait Gallery: http://www.npg.org.uk/collections/search/person/mp62247/sir-alfred-hamilton-grant-12th-bt

References 

Indian Civil Service (British India) officers
1872 births
1937 deaths
Knights Commander of the Order of the Star of India
Knights Commander of the Order of the Indian Empire
Baronets in the Baronetage of Nova Scotia
Alumni of Balliol College, Oxford
People educated at Fettes College
Diplomats from Edinburgh
Liberal Party (UK) parliamentary candidates
Politicians from Edinburgh